Shannon Byrnes (born 7 April 1984) is a former Australian rules footballer who last played for the Melbourne Football Club in the Australian Football League (AFL) after a ten-year career with the Geelong Football Club. He is currently a development manager at the Geelong Cats Football Club.

Career
Byrnes was recruited from the Murray Bushrangers and was the last draftee selected by the Geelong Football Club in the AFL rookie draft in 2002. He was given the guernsey number 46, but changed it to 17 at the start of the 2005 season. Byrnes also wore the #10 guernsey when he co-captained the Murray Bushrangers.

As a second year rookie, he was promoted to Geelong's senior list for the remainder of the 2004 season, replacing James Kelly who was out for the rest of the year after breaking his leg against the West Coast Eagles.
Byrnes was used effectively off the bench mainly in his first 2 seasons on the senior list, and earnt a rising star nomination in 2005 with a 24 possession and 2 goal game against the West Coast Eagles at Subiaco.

The speedy-left footer had an inconsistent season in 2006, with fluctuating form, and the inability to break into a strong team seeing him being put in and out of the playing squad. In 2007, Byrnes very strong form at VFL level could not be ignored, he found his way in to the senior team at the right end of the season and was a part of the 2007 Premiership team, picking up 14 disposals and kicking one goal.

After a lacklustre season in 2008 and missing out on playing finals, he produced the best year of his career to date in 2009 kicking 32 goals 11 behinds for the season. He cemented a spot in the team, missing only two games due to injury, and was picked to play in the 2009 AFL Grand Final, where he had 16 possessions, kicked one goal and became a two-time premiership player. He backed up this year with another very good year in 2010 kicking 35 goals for the season.

In 2011 he only played five games, in an injury plagued year missing most of the season due to knee and calf injuries. He was selected as an emergency for the 2011 AFL Grand Final, but despite there being some injury concerns over Steve Johnson, he was not called up to the final team.

Byrnes announced his retirement on 30 July 2014, effective immediately.

Statistics

|-
|- style="background-color: #EAEAEA"
! scope="row" style="text-align:center" | 2004
|style="text-align:center;"|
| 46 || 4 || 1 || 3 || 22 || 13 || 35 || 13 || 15 || 0.3 || 0.8 || 5.5 || 3.3 || 8.8 || 3.3 || 3.8
|-
! scope="row" style="text-align:center" | 2005
|style="text-align:center;"|
| 17 || 19 || 8 || 13 || 150 || 95 || 245 || 56 || 47 || 0.4 || 0.7 || 7.9 || 5.0 || 12.9 || 2.9 || 2.5
|- style="background-color: #EAEAEA"
! scope="row" style="text-align:center" | 2006
|style="text-align:center;"|
| 17 || 10 || 3 || 11 || 100 || 47 || 147 || 58 || 26 || 0.3 || 1.1 || 10.0 || 4.7 || 14.7 || 5.8 || 2.6
|-
! scope="row" style="text-align:center;" | 2007
|style="text-align:center;"|
| 17 || 12 || 7 || 11 || 90 || 107 || 197 || 53 || 40 || 0.6 || 0.9 || 7.5 || 8.9 || 16.4 || 4.4 || 3.3
|- style="background-color: #EAEAEA"
! scope="row" style="text-align:center" | 2008
|style="text-align:center;"|
| 17 || 9 || 8 || 10 || 78 || 65 || 143 || 35 || 28 || 0.9 || 1.1 || 8.7 || 7.2 || 15.9 || 3.9 || 3.1
|-
! scope="row" style="text-align:center;" | 2009
|style="text-align:center;"|
| 17 || 22 || 32 || 11 || 196 || 212 || 408 || 111 || 64 || 1.5 || 0.5 || 8.9 || 9.6 || 18.5 || 5.0 || 2.9
|- style="background-color: #EAEAEA"
! scope="row" style="text-align:center" | 2010
|style="text-align:center;"|
| 17 || 23 || 35 || 20 || 199 || 195 || 394 || 109 || 65 || 1.5 || 0.9 || 8.7 || 8.5 || 17.1 || 4.7 || 2.8
|-
! scope="row" style="text-align:center" | 2011
|style="text-align:center;"|
| 17 || 5 || 5 || 2 || 31 || 16 || 47 || 8 || 5 || 1.0 || 0.4 || 6.2 || 3.2 || 9.4 || 1.6 || 1.0
|- style="background-color: #EAEAEA"
! scope="row" style="text-align:center" | 2012
|style="text-align:center;"|
| 17 || 4 || 1 || 2 || 18 || 22 || 40 || 10 || 12 || 0.3 || 0.5 || 4.5 || 5.5 || 10.0 || 2.5 || 3.0
|-
! scope="row" style="text-align:center" | 2013
|style="text-align:center;"|
| 10 || 17 || 12 || 11 || 127 || 116 || 243 || 62 || 38 || 0.7 || 0.6 || 7.5 || 6.8 || 14.3 || 3.6 || 2.2
|- style="background-color: #EAEAEA"
! scope="row" style="text-align:center" | 2014
|style="text-align:center;"|
| 10 || 6 || 5 || 3 || 28 || 37 || 65 || 11 || 16 || 0.8 || 0.5 || 4.7 || 6.2 || 10.8 || 1.8 || 2.7
|- class="sortbottom"
! colspan=3| Career
! 131
! 117
! 97
! 1039
! 925
! 1964
! 526
! 356
! 0.9
! 0.7
! 7.9
! 7.1
! 15.0
! 4.0
! 2.7
|}

References

External links

1984 births
Geelong Football Club players
Geelong Football Club Premiership players
Living people
Australian rules footballers from Victoria (Australia)
Murray Bushrangers players
Shepparton Football Club players
Melbourne Football Club players
Casey Demons players
Two-time VFL/AFL Premiership players